Ben Quilter (born 8 October 1981) is a British paralympic judoka. He represented Great Britain at the 2008 Summer Paralympics and the 2012 Summer Paralympics.

Born in Brighton, Quilter is visually impaired after developing Stargardt disease in 1992. In 2012 at the 2012 Summer Paralympics, he won a bronze medal in the under 60 kg men's category.

See also
 Judo in the United Kingdom

References

1981 births
Living people
Sportspeople from Brighton
British male judoka
Paralympic martial artists of Great Britain
Paralympic bronze medalists for Great Britain
Judoka at the 2008 Summer Paralympics
Judoka at the 2012 Summer Paralympics
Medalists at the 2012 Summer Paralympics
Paralympic medalists in judo
Paralympic judoka of Great Britain
20th-century British people
21st-century British people